The First Board of Ministers was the executive body opposite the State Council of Ceylon between 1931 and 1936. It was formed in July 1931 after the state council election and it ended in December 1935 with dissolution of the first 1st State Council. The Board of Ministers consisted of ten members, three ex-officio British officials (Chief Secretary, Financial Secretary and Legal Secretary) and the chairmen of the State Council's seven executive committees. The Chief Secretary was the chairman of the Board of Ministers whilst the Leader of the State Council was its vice-chairman.

Members

References
 

1931 establishments in Ceylon
1935 disestablishments in Ceylon
Cabinets established in 1931
Cabinets disestablished in 1935
Cabinet of Sri Lanka
Ministries of George V
State Council of Ceylon